The Bell XH-15 (Bell Model 54) was an American four-seat utility helicopter designed and built by Bell Helicopter, to meet a requirement for a liaison and utility helicopter for the United States Army and United States Air Force.

Development
The Model 54 was a conventional pod-and-boom four-seat helicopter with wheeled, fixed tricycle landing gear, powered by a single 275 hp Continental XO-470-5 piston engine located in the rear cabin, driving a single two-bladed rotor. The United States Army Air Forces (USAAF) ordered three in February 1946 as the XR-15. The first flight was made in March 1948 with the new designation XH-15, but no orders were forthcoming following evaluation by the United States Air Force (USAF) and the project ended in 1950.

Variants
XR-15
Military designation for three Model 54s ordered for evaluation.
XH-15
XR-15 redesignated before delivery.

Operators

 United States Air Force

Specifications

See also

References

Notes

Bibliography

 

1940s United States military utility aircraft
1940s United States helicopters
Aircraft first flown in 1948
H-15
Single-engined piston helicopters